Proteininae Erichson 1839 are a subfamily of Staphylinidae.

Anatomy
Broad bodied.
Small, under 3 mm.
Elytra long, covering first visible abdominal tergite.
Tarsi 5-5-5 in NA, 4-4-4 in some southern hemisphere taxa.

Ecology
Habitat: found in fungi, under bark, in decaying vegetation, forest leaf litter.
Collection method: sift/Berlese leaf litter.
Biology: saprophages or mycophages.

Systematics
Two genera and 22 species in North America.

References

External links

Proteininae at Bugguide.net. 

Staphylinidae
Beetle subfamilies